Mira Quien Baila (also known as Mira Quien Baila 2012 and Mira Quien Baila 3) debuted on Univision on September 9, 2012 at 8pm central. The TV series is the Spanish version of British version Strictly Come Dancing and American Version Dancing with the Stars (U.S. TV series). Ten celebrities are paired with ten professional ballroom dancers. The winner will receive $150,000 for their charity.
Javier Posa and Chiquinquirá Delgado are the hosts for this season.

Judges

The celebrities

Scores 

Red numbers indicate the lowest score for each week.
Green numbers indicate the highest score for each week.
 indicates the couple eliminated that week.
 indicates the couple withdrew from the competition.
 indicates the couple that was safe but withdrew from the competition.
 indicates the winning couple.
 indicates the runner-up couple.
 indicates the third-place couple.

Call-Out Order

Week 1-2 were duel weeks, with no actual eliminations.
Week 9, all celebrities were immune from elimination, making them go to semifinals automatically.

References 

2012 American television seasons